Covington is a city in King County, Washington, United States. The population was 20,777 at the time of the 2020 census.  Prior to the 2010 census, Covington was counted as part of Covington-Sawyer-Wilderness CDP.

History
The area presently known as Covington was originally known as Jenkins Prairie. Between 1899 and 1900 the Northern Pacific Railway built a cut-off between Auburn and Kanaskat, improving the company's primary east–west route across Stampede Pass. Richard Covington, a surveyor for the Northern Pacific Railroad worked out of Fort Vancouver establishing the line through western Washington to complete the line from St. Paul, Minnesota, to Auburn.  According to the NP's construction records at the University of Montana's K. Ross Toole Archives, the primary contractors were banker Horace C. Henry of Seattle, Washington, and long-time railroad contractor Nelson Bennett of Tacoma, Washington, the NP's prime contractor for Stampede Tunnel, which he completed in 1888. The project engineer in Auburn was George Allen Kyle. The NP's principal assistant engineer in Tacoma, overseeing both Kyle and Bennett's work, was Charles S. Bihler.

In 1900, during the building of the Palmer Cut-Off from Kanaskat to Auburn, the Northern Pacific installed at 2,850-foot passing track, a 700-foot loading track, a second class section house (which broke down to $1,000 for construction, $100 for an outhouse, and $50 for furnishings), a 24-man bunkhouse, a box tank and standpipe for watering steam locomotives at Covington. By 1908 the tiny village was home to the Covington Lumber Company, which had set up a mill capable of cutting 85,000 board feet of timber a day. No photograph is known to exist of the station at this site, apparently built after the cut-off construction. It operated on and off until the Great Depression and was removed in 1941.

A school district was established in 1937. Over the years the area grew as an unincorporated area of Kent. A vote to incorporate Covington as a city was passed on November 6, 1996, the same day as a similar measure creating neighboring Maple Valley. Covington was officially incorporated as a city on August 31, 1997.

Geography
Covington is located in southern King County. The city is surrounded by Kent to the west, Auburn to the southwest, and Maple Valley to the east.

Economy
With its rapid population growth since the city's incorporation, much of the city's income depends on the retail industry. The city's retail core, which largely developed in the 2000s, is located along the SR-516 corridor. Among the businesses in the retail core a Walmart, Kohl's, Costco, and The Home Depot.

Covington is also a regional medical hub for southeast King County with MultiCare Health Systems and Valley Medical Center each having facilities in the city. MultiCare opened a four-story hospital serving the city in 2018 with 58 beds, emergency rooms, and a family birth center.

Government

The city is governed by a council-manager government consisting of a seven-person city council. Members are elected at-large, (that is, each is elected by all citizens of the city, not by districts).

Fire protection is provided by Puget Sound Regional Fire Authority.

Public schools in the city are part of the Kent School District.

Demographics

2010 census
As of the census of 2010, there were 17,575 people, 5,817 households, and 4,649 families residing in the city. The racial makeup of the city was 76.1% White, 4.2% African American, 0.8% Native American, 8.5% Asian, 0.6% Pacific Islander, 3.9% from other races, and 5.8% from two or more races. Hispanic or Latino of any race were 9.3% of the population.

There were 5,817 households, of which 46.5% had children under the age of 18 living with them, 63.2% were married couples living together, 11.0% had a female householder with no husband present, 5.7% had a male householder with no wife present, and 20.1% were non-families. 14.4% of all households were made up of individuals, and 4.1% had someone living alone who was 65 years of age or older. The average household size was 3.02 and the average family size was 3.31.

The median age in the city was 34.7 years. 28.6% of residents were under the age of 18; 8.8% were between the ages of 18 and 24; 28.9% were from 25 to 44; 27.4% were from 45 to 64; and 6.3% were 65 years of age or older. The gender makeup of the city was 50.0% male and 50.0% female.

2000 census
As of the census of 2000, there were 13,783 people, 4,398 households, and 3,689 families residing in the city. The population density was 2,389.8 people per square mile (922.3/km). There were 4,473 housing units at an average density of 775.5 per square mile (299.3/km). The racial makeup of the city was 87.88% White, 2.44% African American, 1.02% Native American, 3.12% Asian, 0.22% Pacific Islander, 1.80% from other races, and 3.53% from two or more races. Hispanic or Latino of any race were 4.48% of the population.

There were 4,398 households, 52.2% of which had children under the age of 18 living with them, 70.1% were married couples living together, 9.7% had a female householder with no husband present, and 16.1% were non-families. 11.4% of all households were made up of individuals, and 1.7% had someone living alone who was 65 years of age or older. The average household size was 3.13 and the average family size was 3.37.

In the city the population was spread out, with 33.8% under the age of 18, 7.0% from 18 to 24, 36.2% from 25 to 44, 19.3% from 45 to 64, and 3.7% who were 65 years of age or older. The median age was 32 years. For every 100 females, there were 103.3 males. For every 100 females age 18 and over, there were 100.2 males.

The median income for a household in the city was $63,711, and the median income for a family was $65,173. Males had a median income of $48,134 versus $34,576 for females. The per capita income for the city was $22,230. About 2.1% of families and 3.6% of the population were below the poverty line, including 3.1% of those under age 18 and 5.9% of those age 65 or over.

Parks and recreation
The City of Covington maintains a year-round aquatic center. The city also offers basketball, baseball, football and soccer youth leagues from pre-k through 8th grade, recreation classes, and special events. The city is also home to eight city-run parks, and one municipally maintained trail.

Infrastructure

Transportation
The city's principal arterial is State Route 516, known locally as Southeast 272nd Street or Kent-Kangley Road, which runs through the city on its west–east route from Des Moines to Maple Valley. The only freeway that passes through the city is State Route 18, which passes through the west side of the city on a northeast–southwest route and, with its connection to Interstate 90 near Snoqualmie, is a major route used by vehicles traveling between south King County and Eastern Washington.

Public transportation is provided by King County Metro.

Emergency services
Covington contracts with the King County Sheriff's Office for police services. Deputies assigned to Covington wear Covington uniforms and drive patrol cars marked with the city logo. There are currently 11 patrol officers, one traffic officer, one detective, and one chief assigned full-time to the city.

Covington is part of the Puget Sound Regional Fire Authority (RFA), along with the cities of Kent, and SeaTac and portions of unincorporated King County. The first fire station in the city limits, a 17,385 square foot fire station was opened in 2009 on SE 256th in 2009. The RFA's board meetings are conducted in the Covington fire station.

Notable people
 Debra Entenman, member of the Washington House of Representatives
 Mark Hargrove, former member of Washington House of Representatives. 
 Reese McGuire, professional baseball player, first round draft pick for the Pittsburgh Pirates
 Lindsey Moore, professional basketball player
 Bob Smith, comic book artist for DC and Archie Comics
 Pat Sullivan, majority leader of the Washington House of Representatives and former mayor of Covington

References

External links
 City of Covington
 History of Covington at HistoryLink

1997 establishments in Washington (state)
Cities in King County, Washington
Cities in the Seattle metropolitan area
Populated places established in 1997
Cities in Washington (state)